Route 51 may refer to:

Route 51 (MTA Maryland), a bus route in Baltimore, Maryland and its suburbs
KMB Route 51, a bus route in Hong Kong
London Buses route 51
Road 51 (Iran)

See also
List of highways numbered 51

51